Typhoon Amy was a super typhoon formed in August and September 1962. Amy made landfall in Taiwan as a category 4 equivalent super typhoon, then in China as a typhoon, moved out into the South China Sea, and finally made landfall in South Korea as a tropical storm.

Meteorological history 

The precursor to Typhoon Amy formed on August 27 northwest of Truk as a surge from the westerlies. The system rapidly gained strength in the open waters of the Pacific Ocean, gaining enough winds to be declared a tropical depression on the morning of August 29. The depression rapidly intensified, becoming a tropical storm within six hours. After passing Saipan, Amy strengthened into a typhoon during the afternoon of August 30. Crossing to the northeast of Luzon, Amy maintained strength, rapidly approaching the island of Taiwan on September 4. The storm slowly weakened to a  typhoon off the coast of Taiwan, making landfall on September 5 near the city of Yilan City. Amy weakened over land slightly before making landfall near Fuzhou later that day. Amy crossed over mainland China for several days, slowly weakening into a minimal tropical storm before crossing back into the waters of the East China Sea near Yancheng. Amy strengthened back to winds of  before weakening into a tropical depression off the coast of South Korea. The depression made landfall near Incheon on September 7, weakening over land. After crossing out into open waters, the remains of Amy became extratropical on September 8, affected by the cold air. The extratropical remains of Amy continued northeast along the North Korean mainland, crossing the island of Sakhalin on September 9. The remains of Amy were lost off the eastern coast of Sakhalin on September 10, west of the Kamchatka Peninsula.

Impact 

Amy's flooding killed 24 people, with millions of dollars in damage, power, communication lines and buildings.

See also 

 Typhoon Opal (1962) - took a similar track a month earlier

References

External links 
 Typhoon 'amy' Hits Formosa (1962) – YouTube
 1962 Typhoon Amy Hits Taiwan – YouTube
 Digital Typhoon : Typhoon 196217 (AMY) – National Institute of Informatics

1962 Pacific typhoon season
Typhoons in Taiwan